Bassenthwaite is a village and civil parish in the borough of Allerdale in Cumbria, historically part of Cumberland, within the Lake District National Park, England.
According to the 2001 census it had a population of 412, increasing to 481 at the 2011 Census. There is a Church of England Church, St John's Bassenthwaite and a tiny Methodist chapel. The village contains many elements of the archetypal English village including a green, primary school and a stream that runs through it.

Robin Hood, Skiddaw, Ullock Pike, Longside Edge and Barf can be seen from the village.

Location

Toponymy
The name 'Bassenthwaite' is derived from an Old Norse name meaning Bastun's clearing. The 1st element is usually taken to be the Anglo-French nickname or surname , originally meaning stick, while the 2nd is the Old Norse  meaning clearing. The lake, in early times known as Bastun's water, takes its name from the village.

Governance
Bassenthwaite is part of the parliamentary constituency of Workington. In the December 2019 general election, the Tory candidate for Workington, Mark Jenkinson, was elected the MP, overturning a 9.4 per cent Labour majority from the 2017 election to eject shadow environment secretary Sue Hayman by a margin of 4,136 votes. Until the December 2019 general election The Labour Party has won the seat in the constituency in every general election since 1979.The Conservative Party has only been elected once in Workington since World War II, at the 1976 by-election.

Prior to Brexit, for the European Parliament residents in Bassenthwaite voted to elect MEP's for the North West England constituency.

For Local Government purposes it is in the Boltons  Ward of Allerdale Borough Council and the Bothel and Wharrels Division of Cumbria County Council.

Bassenthwaite has its own Parish Council; Bassenthwaite Parish Council.

St Bega's Church

The Church of St Bega is the parish church of Bassenthwaite, it's in a field near the lake, some distance away from the village. It was built about 950 AD and is a Grade II* listed building,

St John's Church was built later as a chapel of ease.

See also

Listed buildings in Bassenthwaite
St Bega's Way

References

External links

  Cumbria County History Trust: Bassenthwaite (nb: provisional research only - see Talk page)

Villages in Cumbria
Allerdale
Civil parishes in Cumbria
Keswick